is a Japanese football player for Thespakusatsu Gunma.

Career
His younger brother Koya is also a professional footballer currently playing for J2 League side F.C. Gifu. 
His father Yahiro is a former professional footballer, and currently a manager of J2 League side Nagoya Grampus.

Club statistics
Updated to end of 2018 season.

References

External links
Profile at Thespakusatsu Gunma
Profile at Montedio Yamagata

1991 births
Living people
Association football people from Hiroshima Prefecture
Japanese footballers
Segunda Divisão players
Japanese expatriate sportspeople in Portugal
Japanese expatriate sportspeople in Germany
J1 League players
J2 League players
J3 League players
Louletano D.C. players
TuS Koblenz players
Kawasaki Frontale players
Giravanz Kitakyushu players
Montedio Yamagata players
Thespakusatsu Gunma players
FC Ryukyu players
Association football midfielders